A Night at Earl Carroll's is a 1940 American musical film directed by Kurt Neumann and written by Lynn Starling. The film stars Ken Murray, Rose Hobart, Elvia Allman, Blanche Stewart, Earl Carroll, J. Carrol Naish, and Lela Moore. The film was released on December 6, 1940 by Paramount Pictures.

Plot

Cast 

Ken Murray as Barney Nelson
Rose Hobart as Ramona Lisa
Elvia Allman as Cobina Gusher
Blanche Stewart as Brenda Gusher
Earl Carroll as himself
J. Carrol Naish as Steve Kalkus
Lela Moore as herself
Jack Norton as Alonzo Smith
Russell Hicks as Mayor Jones of Hollywood 
William B. Davidson as Mayor Green of San Bernardino
John Harmon as Mac
Forbes Murray as Mayor Brown of Pasadena
Ralph Emerson as Mayor Gray of Bakersfield
Ray Walker  as Jerry
Allan Cavan as Mayor White of El Centro
George McKay as Mayor Stokes of San Diego
Truman Bradley as Radio Announcer
Beryl Wallace as Miss DuBarry
Ruth Rogers as Miss DeMilo
Sheila Ryan as Miss Borgia
John Laing as Vic 
Mary Lou Cook as The Hot Singer
Florine McKinney as Girl Orchestra Leader
Emory Parnell as Policeman

References

External links 
 

1940 films
Paramount Pictures films
American musical films
1940 musical films
Films directed by Kurt Neumann
Films scored by Victor Young
American black-and-white films
1940s English-language films
1940s American films